Kasagala Archaeological Museum is a site museum located at Kasagala, Sri Lanka. It was maintained by Department of Archaeology of Sri Lanka. The museum is used to exhibit antiquities belonging to Kasagala and surrounding area.

See also 
 List of museums in Sri Lanka

References 

Museums in Hambantota District